Quercus ellipsoidalis, the northern pin oak or Hill's oak, is a North American species of oak tree native to the north-central United States and south-central Canada, primarily in the Great Lakes region and the Upper Mississippi Valley. It most commonly occurs on dry, sandy soils.

Description
Each lobe has 3–7 bristle-tipped teeth. The leaf is nearly hairless, except for small tufts of pale orange-brown down where the lobe veins join the central vein. The inner surface of the acorn cap is glabrous (hairless) to sparsely or moderately pubescent, and the hairs if present tend to be kinky rather than straight.

Taxonomy
Although the common name suggests a resemblance to the pin oak (Q. palustris), Q. ellipsoidalis has traditionally been thought to be closely related to the scarlet oak (Q. coccinea), and was in fact included in that species by many botanists. Recent work suggests that there is more gene flow between Hill's oak and black oak (Q. velutina), but the phylogenetic position of these species is still uncertain. The morphological similarity between Q. ellipsoidalis and Q. coccinea remains a source of confusion, especially in northwestern Indiana and southern Cook County, Illinois.

Uses
Northern pin oak is planted as an ornamental tree, popular for its bright red fall color and tolerance of infertile sandy soils. The wood is used for fence posts, fuel and general construction. The cultivar 'Hemelrijk' has gained the Royal Horticultural Society's Award of Garden Merit.

References

External links
 
 
 Photo of herbarium specimen at Missouri Botanical Garden, collected in Illinois in 1899

ellipsoidalis
Trees of the Great Lakes region (North America)
Trees of the Plains-Midwest (United States)
Trees of Ontario
Plants described in 1899
Least concern plants
Least concern flora of North America
Least concern flora of the United States